The 1968 United States Senate election in Illinois was held on November 5, 1968 to elect one of Illinois's members to the United States Senate. Incumbent Republican U.S. Senator and Minority Leader Everett Dirksen won re-election to his fourth term.

Election information
The primaries and general election coincided with those for other federal (United States president and  House) and those for state elections.

Primaries were held on June 11.

Turnout
Turnout in the primary elections was 23.90%, with a total of 1,303,375 votes cast.

Turnout during the general election was 78.39%, with 4,449,757 votes cast.

Democratic primary
Illinois Attorney General William G. Clark won the Democratic primary, running unopposed.

Republican primary
Incumbent U.S. Senator, and Senate Minority Leader, Everett M. Dirksen, won renomination over Roy C. Johnson.

General election

Results
Dirksen carried 99 of the state's 102 counties. Clark, however, carried the state's most populous county, Cook County, taking 54.07% of the vote, to Dirksen's 45.52%. Since Cook County was home to 50.65% of the votes cast in the election, the final result of the election was close, despite Dirksen winning a landslide 60.70% of the vote to Clark's 38.92% in the other 101 counties of the state.

Additionally, in Cook County's principal city, Chicago (from which 31.02% of all statewide ballots were cast), Clark won 63.90% of the vote to Dirksen's 35.58%. Clark's majority in Chicago and Cook County was insufficient to roll back Dirksen's large majorities in the Chicago suburbs and Downstate.

See also 
 United States Senate elections, 1968

References 

Illinois
United States Senate
United States Senate elections in Illinois